The men's singles wheelchair tennis tournament at the 2020 Paralympic Games in Tokyo was held at the Ariake Tennis Park in Kōtō, Tokyo from 27 August to 4 September 2021.

Japan's Shingo Kunieda defeated the Netherlands' Tom Egberink in the final, 6–1, 6–2 to win the gold medal in men's singles wheelchair tennis at the 2020 Tokyo Paralympics. It was his third Paralympic singles gold medal, and fourth Paralympic gold overall.

Great Britain's Gordon Reid was the defending gold medalist, but was defeated by Kunieda in the semifinals; he went on to defeat compatriot Alfie Hewett in the bronze-medal match, in a rematch of the previous edition's final.

Seeds 

  (champion, gold medalist)
  (semifinals)
  (third round)
  (quarterfinals)
  (semifinals, bronze medalist)
  (quarterfinals)
  (quarterfinals)
  (final, silver medalist)

  (third round)
  (third round)
  (third round)
  (third round)
  (quarterfinals)
  (second round)
  (third round)
  (third round)

Draw

 BPC = Bipartite Invitation

Finals

Top half

Section 1

Section 2

Bottom half

Section 3

Section 4

References 

Wheelchair tennis at the 2020 Summer Paralympics